Yesterday, Today, & Tomorrow is a studio album by American soul vocal group The Spinners, released in 1977.

Reception
The editors of AllMusic Guide scored Yesterday, Today, & Tomorrow 2.5 of five stars, with reviewer Jason Elias noting that this release "drew the hitmaking ways to a screeching halt" after a string of "fulfilling and immaculately produced albums" guided by Thom Bell. He also notes differences between the sessions that led to this album, with some featuring Philippé Wynne, recorded during the making of Happiness Is Being with the Spinners and others with his replacement John Edwards.

Track listing
"Me and My Music" (Sherman Marshall and Ted Wortham) – 4:25
"I Found Love (When I Found You)" (Phillip T. Pugh and Sherman Marshall) – 5:08
"I'm Riding Your Shadow (Down to Love)" (Bruce Hawes, Joseph Jefferson, and Charles Simmons) – 4:12
"You're the Love of My Life" (Michael Burton and Phil Terry) – 4:20
"I Must Be Living for a Broken Heart" (Joseph Jefferson and Charles Simmons) – 4:56
"Honey, I'm in Love with You" (Tony Bell, Leroy M. Bell, and Thom Bell) – 5:43
"Just to Be with You" (Phillip T. Pugh and Sherman Marshall) – 8:14
"You're Throwing a Good Love Away" (Sherman Marshall and Ted Wortham) – 8:38

Personnel

The Spinners
John Edwards (later sessions) – vocals
Henry Fambrough – baritone vocals
Billy Henderson – tenor vocals
Pervis Jackson – bass vocals, backing vocals
Bobby Smith – tenor vocals
Philippé Wynne (earlier sessions) – vocals
Additional musicians (see MFSB)
Bob Babbitt – bass guitar
Anthony S. Bell – guitar
Thom Bell – keyboards, arrangement on all tracks except "Honey, I'm in Love with You", production
Carla Benson – backing vocals
Evette Benson – backing vocals
Bobby Eli – guitar
Barbara Ingram – backing vocals
Andrew Smith – drums
Larry Washington – percussion
Technical personnel
Tony Bell – arrangement on "Honey, I'm in Love with You"
James Gaines – assistant engineering
Bernie Grundman – mastering at A & M Studios, Hollywood, California, United States
Mike Hutchinson – assistant engineering
Win Koots – assistant engineering
Don Murray – engineering
Richard J. Stanley – photography
Eric Porter – art direction
Jeffrey Stewart – assistant engineering
Linda Tyler – assistant engineering
Mixed at Sound Labs, Los Angeles, California, United States and Kaye–Smith Studios, Seattle, Washington, United States

Chart performance
Domestically, Yesterday, Today, & Tomorrow reached 26 on the Billboard 200 and eleventh place on the R&B charts. In Canada, it topped out at 36, according to RPM.

See also
List of 1977 albums

References

External links

1977 albums
Albums produced by Thom Bell
Atlantic Records albums
The Spinners (American group) albums